"Relator" is the first single from Break Up, a collaborative album between Pete Yorn and Scarlett Johansson. It was written and arranged by Pete Yorn. The single was released as a digital download on May 12, 2009 and was available as an Amazon.com exclusive release. It samples lyrics from "All My Loving" by The Beatles.

Promotion
On September 10, 2009, Yorn and Johansson performed "Relator" on the French television show Le Grand Journal.

Pete Yorn and Scarlett Johansson performed "Relator" on the October 12, 2009 episode of The Ellen DeGeneres Show.

Music video
A music video for "Relator" was released on August 12 on Yahoo! Music and subsequently on VH1.  Directed by Jim Wright, shot at Studio 1444 in Hollywood, the video shows Yorn and Johansson interplaying as a couple while performing the song.

Sales chart performance

References

2009 singles
Pete Yorn songs
Scarlett Johansson songs
Atco Records singles
Rhino Records singles
Male–female vocal duets
2009 songs